Moutoullas ( []) is a mountain village in the Nicosia District of Cyprus, at an elevation of  in Marathasa Valley. In 2011, it had a population of 174.

The old village church, the 13th-century chapel of Panayia tou Moutoulla, is one of the earliest-dated examples of the steep-pitched wooden roof type with frescoes. It was built in around 1280 and has been declared a UNESCO World Heritage Site, along with nine other Painted Churches in the Troodos Region, because of their unique murals and archicture.

References

Communities in Nicosia District
Panayia tou Moutoulla